Jüri Talvet (born 17 December 1945, in Pärnu) is an Estonian poet and academic. He is the author of various literary works including poetry, criticism, and essays.

Education
Talvet received his MA degree in English philology from the University of Tartu in 1972 and defended his PhD degree in Western European literature at Leningrad (St. Petersburg) University in 1981.

Career
In 1974 Talvet began teaching Western literary history at the University of Tartu and has worked as a full-time Professor and Chair of Comparative Literature at the university since 1992. In 1992/1993 he founded Spanish studies at the school.

He has chaired the Estonian Association of Comparative Literature since 1994. He is the editor of Interlitteraria, the annual international journal of comparative literature published by Tartu University Press.

In addition to his university roles, Talvet has also worked as an Estonian translator of Spanish works by authors such as Francisco de Quevedo and Gabriel García Márquez.

Works

Poetry
Äratused (Awakenings, Tallinn, Eesti Raamat, 1981)
Ambur ja karje (The Archer and the Cry, Tallinn, Eesti Raamat, 1986)
Hinge kulg ja kliima üllatused (The Soul’s Progress and Surprises of Climate, Tallinn, Eesti Raamat, 1990)
Eesti eleegia ja teisi luuletusi (Estonian Elegy and Other Poems, Tallinn, Kupar, 1997)
Kas sul viinamarju ka on? (Do You Have Also Grapes?, Tartu, Ilmamaa, 2001)
Unest, lumest (From Dreams, from Snow, Tartu, Ilmamaa, 2005)
Silmad peksavad une seinu  (Eyes Beat the Walls of Sleep, Tartu, Ilmamaa, 2008)
Elegía estonia y otros poemas (a selection in Spanish, translated by author and Albert Lázaro-Tinaut, Valencia, Palmart Capitelum, 2002)
Estonian Elegy. Selected Poems (translated by H. L. Hix, Toronto, Guernica, 2008)
Del sueño, de la nieve (Antología 2001-2009) (a selection in Spanish, translated by Albert Lázaro-Tinaut and revised by the author, Zaragoza, Olifante Ediciones de Poesía, 2010)

Essays and Travelogues
Teekond Hispaaniasse (A Journey to Spain, Tallinn, Loomingu Raamatukogu, 1985)
Hispaaniast Ameerikasse (From Spain to America, Tallinn, Eesti Raamat, 1992)
Hispaania vaim (The Spanish Spirit, Tartu, Ilmamaa, 1995)
Ameerika märkmed ehk Kaemusi Eestist (American Notes or Contemplations of Estonia, Tartu, Ilmamaa, 2000)
Sümbiootiline kultuur (Symbiotic Culture, Tartu, Tartu Ülikooli Kirjastus, 2005)
Tõrjumatu äär (The Irrefutable Border, Tartu, Ilmamaa, 2005)
A Call for Cultural Symbiosis (essay, translated by H. L. Hix, Toronto, Guernica, 2005)

Translations
Kadunud aja meri, Gabriel García Márquez (Tallinn, Loomingu Raamatukogu, 1980)
Tormese Lazarillo elukäik, (Tallinn, Eesti Raamat, 1983)
Valik luulet, Francisco de Quevedo (Tallinn, Eesti Raamat, 1987)
Käsioraakel ja arukuse kunst, Baltasar Gracián (Tallinn, Eesti Raamat, 1993)
Elu on unenägu, Pedro Calderón de la Barca (Tallinn, Kunst, 1999)
Suur maailmateater, Pedro Calderón de la Barca (Tartu, Tartu Ülikooli Kirjastus, 2006)
Sevilla pilkaja ja kivist külaline, Tirso de Molina (Tartu, Tartu Ülikooli Kirjastus, 2006)
On the Way Home: An Anthology of Contemporary Estonian Poetry, translated with H. L. Hix (New Delhi, Sarup & Sons, 2006)
Kindel kui linnulend, H. L. Hix (Tartu, Tartu Ülikooli Kirjastus, 2007)
Kohaühtsus, Carlos Vitale (Tartu, Tartu Ülikooli Kirjastus, 2008)

Edited books
Meel paremat ei kannata / The Mind Would Bear No Better, Juhan Liiv, translated with H. L. Hix (Tartu, Tartu Ülikooli Kirjastus, 2007)
Tuulehoog lõi vetesse, Juhan Liiv (Tallinn, Tänapäev, 2007)
Ameerika luule antoloogia. Poe’st, Whitmanist ja Dickinsonist XX sajandi lõpuni (Tartu, Tartu Ülikooli Kirjastus, 2008)

Awards
Talvet has been awarded the Estonian Annual Prize of Literature (1986), the Juhan Liiv Prize of Poetry (1997) and the Ivar Ivask Memorial Prize for poetry and essay (2002).

References

Further reading
Lauri Pilter. "A Drama of a Philosophy of Senses: Jüri Talvet’s Poetry". Interlitteraria 1:160-180.

External links
https://web.archive.org/web/20060927224910/http://www.einst.ee/literary/spring97/04talvet.htm  An interview with J. Talvet, by H. L. Hix, Estonian Literary Magazine, Spring 1997
https://web.archive.org/web/20080921095553/http://www.fenkefeng.org/jt.html Fenke Feng Cultural Group
http://goliath.ecnext.com/coms2/gi_0199-3245793/Juri-Talvet-Kas-sul-viinamarju.html Excerpt from a review by Janika Kronberg in World Literature Today, April–June 2003

1945 births
Living people
People from Pärnu
Estonian male poets
University of Tartu alumni
20th-century Estonian poets
21st-century Estonian poets
Recipients of the Order of the White Star, 4th Class
20th-century male writers
21st-century male writers
Estonian translators
20th-century translators
21st-century translators
Translators from Spanish
Translators to Estonian